The Lac Archambault is a freshwater body crossed from north to south by the Sautauriski River, flowing in the unorganized territory of Lac-Jacques-Cartier, in the regional county municipality (MRC) La Côte-de-Beaupré Regional County Municipality, in the administrative region of Capitale-Nationale, in province of Quebec, in Canada.

Lac Archambault is located in Jacques-Cartier National Park.

The watershed of Lake Archambault is mainly served on the east side by the route 175 which connects the cities of Quebec and Saguenay. A few secondary roads serve this area for forestry and recreational tourism activities.

Forestry is the main economic activity in the sector; recreational tourism, second.

The surface of Lake Archambault is generally frozen from the beginning of December to the end of March; however, safe circulation on the ice is generally from late December to early March.

Geography 
This lake between the mountains takes the form of a triange. It is mainly fed by the outlet (coming from the northwest) of Lac Nouvel and an unidentified stream (coming from the north). Its mouth is located on the southwest bank.

From the mouth of Lake Archambault, the current descends on  generally southward following the course of the Sautauriski River; then on  generally towards the south along the current of the Jacques-Cartier River to the northeast bank of the Saint Lawrence river.

Toponymy 
The toponymic designation of this lake was assigned in 1931 by the Commission de géographie du Québec as part of the systematic allocation of several bodies of water in Parc des Laurentides, which was partly replaced by the Laurentides Wildlife Reserve. This systematic allocation process was intended to recall the memories of soldiers from the Royal 22e Régiment who participated in the First World War. Private René Archambault was born in Montreal in 1898. Enlisted in his hometown, in March 1917, in the 245th Battalion, he was transferred to the 22nd Battalion, which became the Royal 22e Régiment. He died in August 1918, during the Battle of Chérisy, in France.

The toponym Lac Archambault was formalized on December 5, 1968, by the Commission de toponymie du Québec.

See also 

 Jacques-Cartier National Park
 La Côte-de-Beaupré Regional County Municipality
 Lac-Jacques-Cartier, a TNO
 Sautauriski LakeLac-Jacques-Cartier
 Sautauriski River
 List of lakes of Canada

Notes and references 

Lakes of Capitale-Nationale
La Côte-de-Beaupré Regional County Municipality